Shah Berunai was the eighth Sultan of Brunei who ruled only a year. He ascended the throne in 1581 on the death of his father Sultan Saiful Rijal. He died in 1582 without any male descendants and was succeeded by his younger brother Pengiran Muda Tengah Muhammad Hassan. During his reign he was concerned with the production of a cannon for the defense of Brunei from the attacks of the Spanish army, that was headquartered in Manila, as a consequence of the Castille War.

See also
 List of Sultans of Brunei

References

Year of birth missing
1582 deaths
16th-century Sultans of Brunei